NBP can stand for:

Acronyms
 Namco Bandai Partners
 Name Binding Protocol
 Nathaniel B. Palmer (icebreaker)
 National Balancing Point (UK)
 NBP F.C. (National Bank of Pakistan football club)
 National Bank of Pakistan
 Narodowy Bank Polski (National Bank of Poland)
 National Battlefield Park, a protected area in the United States
 National Bolshevik Party
 National broadband plan
 Neutral body posture
 Network Bootstrap Program
 New Bilibid Prison
 New Black Panthers
 New Blue Party of Ontario
 NicerBooks! Publishing, an imprint of VDM Publishing
 Nobilis Patricius Bruxellensis: a descendant of the Seven noble houses of Brussels with a title of nobility.
 Nonparametric belief propagation
 Northern Black Polished Ware
 Normal blood pressure
 Normal boiling point
 NVIDIA Business Platform

Other
 Nnam language (ISO 639 language code nbp)
 Nibhapur railway station (train station code NBP); see List of railway stations in India
 .NBP, a file extension of Mathematica

See also

pl:NBP